Yolo City may refer to:
Woodland, California, formerly called Yolo City
Yolo, California, an unincorporated community